Antoine Perel (born 9 April 1986) is a Paralympian athlete from France competing mainly in category T12 long jump, pentathlon and sprint events.

Career history
Perel has cone dystrophy a condition which effects his vision. He is a multi-event athlete and competes in T12 (track), P12 (pentathlon) and F12 (field) category sports. His favoured sport is the long jump. His first major tournament was the 2004 French Open and in 2008 he qualified for the 2008 Summer Paralympics in both the F12 long jump and P12 pentathlon. He finished ninth in both events.

At the 2012 Summer Paralympics, Perel saw both his favoured events dropped from the schedule for his classification. He attempted to make it to the Games as a triple jumper but failed to qualify for the event. The next year he entered the 2013 IPC Athletics World Championships in Lyon entering both the long jump and 100m relay. He failed to medal in the long jump, having the disadvantage of entering the F13 event as his F12 event was again dropped from the schedule. In the T11-13 relay he along with his teammates Hyacinthe Deleplace, Bacou Dambakate and Gauthier Makunda finished third to take the bronze medal.

References

External links
 

Paralympic athletes of France
1986 births
Living people
French male long jumpers
French male sprinters
French pentathletes
Athletes (track and field) at the 2008 Summer Paralympics
Place of birth missing (living people)
20th-century French people
21st-century French people